Kristin Neff is an associate professor in the University of Texas at Austin's department of educational psychology. Dr. Neff received her doctorate from the University of California at Berkeley, studying moral development.  She did two years of postdoctoral study at the University of Denver studying self-concept development. She created the Self-compassion Scales. The long scale consists of 26 items and the short scale consists of 12 items. She has been credited with conducting the first academic studies into self-compassion. 

In addition to her academic work, she is author of "Self-Compassion: The Proven Power of Being Kind to Yourself," released by William Morrow. She is co-founder of the nonprofit Center for Mindful Self-Compassion.  Drs. Neff and Germer co-authored the book The Mindful Self-Compassion Workbook, which was published by Guilford in 2018, and Teaching the Mindful Self-Compassion Program: A Guide for Professionals in 2019.

Neff has been interviewed for The Atlantic and has written for University of California, Berkeley's Greater Good Magazine.

References

External links
 
 

American women psychologists
Educational psychologists
University of Texas at Austin faculty
University of California, Berkeley alumni
Year of birth missing (living people)
Living people
American women academics
21st-century American women
American educational psychologists